The men's triple jump was an event at the 1956 Summer Olympics in Melbourne, Australia. The event was also known at the time as the hop, step and jump. Thirty-two athletes from 20 nations competed. The maximum number of athletes per nation had been set at 3 since the 1930 Olympic Congress. The event was won by Adhemar da Silva of Brazil, successfully defending his 1952 title. He was the second man to do so, after Myer Prinstein in 1900 and 1904. Vilhjálmur Einarsson won Iceland's first Olympic medal in any event with the silver in this competition. Vitold Kreyer put the Soviet Union on the men's triple jump podium for the second Games in a row with his bronze.

Summary

The qualification round mark was set at 14.80 metres. Eleven athletes didn't surpass that distance in the morning session.

During the afternoon final, Bill Sharpe took the early lead with an American record 15.88m. In the second round, the surprise of the Olympics Vilhjálmur Einarsson jumped a wind aided 16.26m to take the lead. Defending champion and world record holder Adhemar da Silva jumped 16.04m. In the third round, Vitold Kreyer moved into bronze medal position with a 16.02m, while Sharpe injured himself on his attempt and was unable to continue the battle. In the fourth round, da Silva popped an Olympic record  to take the lead. da Silva backed up his jump by equalling Einarsson's best jump in the fifth round and adding a 16.21m in the final round. da Silva became Brazil's first back to back winner, while Einarsson won Iceland's first medal.

Background

This was the 13th appearance of the event, which is one of 12 athletics events to have been held at every Summer Olympics. Returning finalists from the 1952 Games were gold medalist Adhemar da Silva of Brazil and silver medalist Leonid Shcherbakov of the Soviet Union. Bronze medalist Asnoldo Devonish of Venezuela was entered but did not compete. In 1953, Shcherbakov had broken da Silva's world record, set at the 1952 Olympics; in 1955, da Silva took the world record back.

Nigeria, North Borneo, Pakistan, Singapore, and Uganda each made their first appearance in the event. The United States competed for the 13th time, having competed at each of the Games so far.

Competition format

The competition used the two-round format introduced in 1936. In the qualifying round, each jumper received three attempts to reach the qualifying distance of 14.80 metres; if fewer than 12 men did so, the top 12 (including all those tied) would advance. In the final round, each athlete had three jumps; the top six received an additional three jumps, with the best of the six to count.

Records

These are the standing world and Olympic records (in metres) prior to the 1956 Summer Olympics.

Vilhjálmur Einarsson jumped what would have been an Olympic record of 16.26 metres in the competition, but this was (a) wind-assisted and (b) improved upon by Adhemar da Silva, who won with a record mark of 16.35 metres.

Schedule

All times are Australian Eastern Standard Time (UTC+10)

Results

Qualifying

Final

References

External links
 Official Report
 Results

M
Triple jump at the Olympics
Men's events at the 1956 Summer Olympics